is a train station in the town of Mihama, Chita District, Aichi Prefecture, Japan, operated by Meitetsu.

Lines

Station layout
The station has two elevated opposed side platforms serving two tracks, with the station building located underneath. The station has automated ticket machines, Manaca automated turnstiles and is staffed.

Platforms

Adjacent stations

Station history
Chita Okuda Station was opened on July 6, 1975. In 2007, the Tranpass system of magnetic fare cards with automatic turnstiles was implemented.

Passenger statistics
In fiscal 2018, the station was used by an average of 2664 passengers daily.

Surrounding area
Nihon Fukushi University

See also
 List of Railway Stations in Japan

References

External links

 Official web page 

Railway stations in Japan opened in 1975
Railway stations in Aichi Prefecture
Stations of Nagoya Railroad
Mihama, Aichi